The Beak of the Finch: A Story of Evolution in Our Time is a 1994 nonfiction book about evolutionary biology, written by Jonathan Weiner. It won  the 1995 Pulitzer Prize for General Non-Fiction. In 2014, a substantially unchanged 20th-anniversary edition e-book was issued with a preface by the author.

Content 
The finches of the title are the Galapagos or 'Darwin's Finches,' passerine songbirds in the Galapagos Islands. The species are so distinct that when Charles Darwin collected them in the islands he thought they were completely different birds, and it was only when he was back in London in 1837 that the ornithologist John Gould revealed that they were closely allied, reinforcing Darwin's growing view that “species are not immutable.” The adaptations of their numerous species, in three genera, show diverging evolution to exploit several ecological niches in the rugged and dry Galápagos Islands.

Weiner follows the career of two biologists, Peter and Rosemary Grant, who have spent twenty years proving that Charles Darwin did not know the full strength of his theory of evolution. On a desert island among the Galapagos, Daphne Major, the Grants are showing that among the finches of the Galapagos, natural selection sometimes takes place so rapidly we can watch it at work. Kim Sterelny (2007) cites this rapid natural selection as illustrating an important point about periods of relative stasis in the punctuated equilibrium hypothesis of Niles Eldredge and Stephen Jay Gould: "In claiming that species typically undergo no further evolutionary change once speciation is complete, they are not claiming that there is no change at all between one generation and the next. Lineages do change. But the change between generations does not accumulate. Instead, over time, the species wobbles about its phenotypic mean. Jonathan Weiner's The Beak of the Finch describes this very process".

Darwin's finches are  different closely related species which Darwin discovered on the Galapagos Islands. Darwin's voyage on the Beagle, and the finches in particular, are known to have influenced his thinking so that he would later produce a basic theory of evolution by natural selection. Darwin reasoned that there had to be a common ancestor. Later, extensive research was done by Peter and Rosemary Grant. The birds are all about the same size (10–20 cm). They mainly differ in the form of the beak. The beak is adapted to the food they eat. The birds are all brownish or black. They have short rounded wings and a rounded tail that often appears cocked to one side. Most male finch mature to a solid black color, while the females mature to a drab grayish color. Exceptions are made for the Vegetarian and Tree Finches the males never become completely black rather they have a black head, neck and upper breast. Warbler, Woodpecker and Mangrove Finches have more of an olive color.

In the conclusion the author relates the speed of evolution to the growing resistance of insects to insecticides and of bacteria to penicillin and related anti-bacterial drugs.

References

External links

1994 non-fiction books
Books about evolution
Pulitzer Prize for General Non-Fiction-winning works
1994 in biology